Kang Ki-Jin (born November 16, 1972) is a South Korean sprint canoer who competed in the early 1990s. At the 1992 Summer Olympics in Barcelona, he was eliminated in the repechages of the K-1 500 m event and the heats of the K-4 1000 m event.

External links
Sports-Reference.com profile

1972 births
Canoeists at the 1992 Summer Olympics
Living people
Olympic canoeists of South Korea
South Korean male canoeists
Asian Games medalists in canoeing
Canoeists at the 1994 Asian Games
Asian Games bronze medalists for South Korea
Medalists at the 1994 Asian Games